Dimophyes is a monotypic genus of hydrozoans belonging to the family Diphyidae. The only species is Dimophyes arctica.

The species has cosmopolitan distribution.

References

Diphyidae
Hydrozoan genera
Monotypic cnidarian genera